The IBM 1443 Printer (sometimes referred to as the 1443 Flying Type Bar Printer) is an obsolete computer line printer used in the punched card era. It was offered in three models: Models 1, 2 and N1; the last two could print up to 240 lines per minute (LPM) with a full character set.

The 1443 was initially introduced October 11, 1962 for use with the IBM 1440 system and withdrawn February 8, 1971.
It was announced in 1963 for the 1620 system.
The printer could also be used on the
IBM 1620 (announced 1963),
IBM 1710,
IBM 1800
and
System/360.

Decades later IBM recycled the 1443 model number to refer to a different product.

Technology

Beginning in 1920, IBM developed a series of printers
 IBM 405 - introduced in 1934 - top speed was 80 lines per minute.
 IBM 402 - introduced after World War II - printed as many as 100 lines per minute.

These IBM printers, as did others of the early punched card era, use "type bars," originally developed for their line of accounting machines.  (The model 1403 introduced new technology.)

Type bars are vertical bars, one for each print position in a line.  Each bar is one character wide with the printer's entire character set: either alphabetic characters, including numerals and symbols, or just numerals and symbols, molded into the front surface in a single column.  In printing, each bar is raised up until the correct character for that print position was opposite the paper, whereupon the bar is pushed toward the paper, so that the correct numeral or letter pressed against the ribbon, striking the paper much the way type slugs leave an impression on paper in a standard typewriter.  This action is relatively slow, as it takes time for each bar to be brought up into the correct position and then drop back down in preparation to print the next line.

1443 printing capabilities
The IBM 1443 Printer was introduced as part of the IBM 1440 system. The 1443 Model 1 prints alphanumeric, upper-case only, output at a basic rate of 150 lines per minute, and it can print up to 430 lines a minute with a restricted character set, depending upon the type bars used. The Model 2's and Model N1's corresponding speeds are 240 and 600 LPM.

The typebars are easily interchangeable, with options for character sets containing 13, 39, 52, or 63 characters.

The print speeds vary according to the model and the character set.

The 1443 printer uses 120 or 144 print hammers and hammer magnets, conceptually similar to the IBM 1132 printer's one-per-column print magnets.

Output is formatted at 10 characters per inch, with a choice of six or eight lines per inch, with additional options for single, double or triple-spacing.

The 1443 uses fan-folded paper with perforated edges for tractor feeding. A carriage control tape specifies form length and the form line where printing was to begin so that paper of various sizes could be used.  A carriage control tape simplifies use of pre-printed forms and the programming needed to allow proper alignment.

Successor technology
Type bars were replaced by type wheels or a drum in later printers, most notably:
 IBM 407 - introduced 1949 - type wheels -  adapted as an input/output unit on the IBM 650
 IBM 716 - introduced in 1952 with the IBM 701 and others in the IBM 700/7000 series
 IBM 1132 - introduced in 1965 with the low cost IBM 1130 computer system.
    
The 1132 was the last printer manufactured by IBM to use the 407's technology. In 1959 this technology was superseded with the introduction of the IBM 1403 chain printer; both the 1132 and 1403 were available with the 1130.

See also
 Line printer

Photos
IBM 1440 system, including a 1443
IBM 1443 typebars, collection of the Computer History Museum

References

IBM printers
Computer-related introductions in 1963